This is a list of volcanoes in Algeria.

See also 
 Geography of Algeria
 List of volcanoes

References 

Algeria
Volcanoes